R. Venkata Rao is the former Vice Chancellor of the National Law School of India University, Banglore.

Career
He has served for 31 years in the Faculty of Law, Andhra University in various capacities. He was Director of Centre of Criminal Justice Andhra University from 1997-2009.  He served as the Vice-Chancellor of the National Law School of India University, Bangalore for a period of 10 years, 2 months and 21 days, before being appointed as the Chairperson of the Vivekananda School of Law and Legal Studies and Vivekananda schools of English Studies.

References

Living people
Academic staff of the National Law School of India University
Place of birth missing (living people)
1954 births